BK or Bk may refer to:

Businesses and organizations
 Burger King, a chain of fast food restaurants
 The Bank of New York Mellon, the New York Stock Exchange symbol for The Bank of New York Mellon Corporation (NYSE:BK)
 Brahma Kumaris, a religious movement
 British Knights, a manufacturer of athletic shoes
 Federal Criminal Police Office (Austria) (Bundeskriminalamt), a federal police force
 Okay Airways (IATA airline code BK)

Science and technology
 BK channel, an ion channel characterized by its large conductance of potassium ions through cell membranes
 BK virus, a member of the polyomavirus family
 Berkelium (Bk), a chemical element
 Elektronika BK, a series of 16-bit PDP-11-compatible Soviet home computers developed by NPO Scientific Center
 Bordkanone, an aircraft cannon
 Brother's Keeper (software), a genealogy software program
 TU Delft Faculty of Architecture (Dutch: Faculteit Bouwkunde)
 Bradykinin, a peptide targeted by ACE inhibitors

Other uses
 B.K. Cannon, (born 1990), actress from Hawaii, USA
 BK (musician), (born 1973), the working name of the English hard house producer Ben Keen
 BK Racing, a former NASCAR team
 Bankruptcy, a legal status of a person or other entity that cannot repay debts
 Bosnia and Herzegovina (FIPS 10-4 country code BK)
 Brooklyn, a borough of New York City